The Green Party (SZ) leadership election of 2016 was held on 23 January 2016. Matěj Stropnický was elected new leader of the party. 222 delegates were allowed to vote.

Candidates
Matěj Stropnický, was considered a Left-wing candidate in the election. He stated that he considers Greens to be a radical party.
Petr Štěpánek, was Stropnický's main rival. He was considered a Liberal candidate. His politics are close to Martin Bursík.
Jan Šlechta, was third candidate. He caused an incident because he was drunk during his candidate speech and was forced out of the hall.

Voting

References

Green Party (Czech Republic) leadership elections
Green Party leadership election
Green Party (Czech Republic) leadership election
Indirect elections
Green Party (Czech Republic) leadership election